Sigillictystis encteta is a moth in the family Geometridae. It is found on Fiji, Vanuatu, Samoa and the Cook Islands.

References

Moths described in 1934
Eupitheciini